Joe Connelly (August 22, 1917 – February 13, 2003) was a television and radio scriptwriter who was born in New York City. As a child he spent several summers in Bellport, New York -- the inspiration for Mayfield in The Leave it to Beaver series.

Connelly had a stint in the Merchant Marine before landing a job at the J. Walter Thompson advertising agency in New York City, where he met Mosher, a fellow copywriter. Mosher left the agency in 1942 and moved to Hollywood to write for the Edgar Bergen and Charlie McCarthy radio show. Connelly soon followed him. In the mid-1940s, after writing for the Frank Morgan and Phil Harris radio shows, they began a 12-year run writing for The Amos 'n' Andy Show including the early 1950s TV version of the popular radio show. Their first solo effort in television was developing a short-lived anthology series for actor Ray Milland, an experience that taught them, Connelly said, to focus their writing instead on "things we know".

Connelly and Bob Mosher were nominated for an Academy Award for Best Story for The Private War of Major Benson, a 1955 comedy that starred Charlton Heston as a hard-nosed Army major who takes command of the ROTC program at a children's academy. It was inspired by an incident Connelly witnessed while driving one of his sons to parochial school.

Leave It to Beaver took their dictum of writing about "things we know" to a new level. Connelly, the father of seven children, and Mosher, the father of two, had to look no further than their own homes for inspiration.
Connelly's 14-year-old son, Jay, served as the model for Beaver's older brother, Wally; and Connelly's 8-year-old son, Ricky, was the inspiration for Beaver, the nickname of one of Connelly's merchant marine shipmates. Connelly reportedly followed his children around with a pad of paper writing down funny situations and lines that were later used in the show.

Connelly is buried in Culver City's Holy Cross Cemetery. He died of a stroke while in the Motion Picture Country Home nursing home in Newport Beach, California after suffering from Alzheimer's disease for years. Connelly outlived both of his wives, Kathryn and Ann  and was survived by his 7 children, 12 grandchildren and 6 great-grandchildren.

References

External links

Joe Connelly at Find a Grave

1917 births
2003 deaths
Burials at Holy Cross Cemetery, Culver City
Businesspeople from New York City
People from Greater Los Angeles
American television writers
American male television writers
Screenwriters from New York (state)
United States Merchant Mariners
20th-century American screenwriters
20th-century American businesspeople
20th-century American male writers